Monroe Township is one of thirteen townships in Grant County, Indiana, United States. As of the 2010 census, its population was 1,677 and it contained 669 housing units.

History
The Israel Jenkins House was listed on the National Register of Historic Places in 2003.

Geography
Lakes in this township include Lake Marion. The streams of Ball Run, Club Run, Little Walnut Creek, Monroe Prairie Creek and Sports Run run through this township.

Cities and towns
 Marion (the county seat)
 Gas City (east edge)

Unincorporated towns
 Arcana
 Friendly Corner
 Jadden
(This list is based on USGS data and may include former settlements.)

Adjacent townships
 Van Buren Township (north)
 Jackson Township, Wells County (northeast)
 Washington Township, Blackford County (east)
 Licking Township, Blackford County (southeast)
 Jefferson Township (south)
 Center Township (west)
 Mill Township (west)
 Washington Township (northwest)

Cemeteries
The township contains one cemetery, Atkinson.

Major highways

Education
Monroe Township residents may obtain a free library card from the Barton Rees Pogue Memorial Public Library in Upland.

References
 U.S. Board on Geographic Names (GNIS)
 United States Census Bureau cartographic boundary files

External links
 Indiana Township Association
 United Township Association of Indiana

Townships in Grant County, Indiana
Townships in Indiana